{|
{{Infobox ship image
|Ship image=File:German large torpedoboat SMS V182 underway before the First World War.jpg
|Ship image size=
|Ship caption=V190s sister ship V182 underway, 1910-1914
}}

|}SMS V190 was a S-138-class large torpedo boat of the Imperial German Navy. She was built by the AG Vulcan shipyard at Stettin between 1910 and 1911, completing on 5 August 1911.

She served throughout the First World War, taking part in the Battle of Heligoland Bight on 28 August 1914. She was renamed T190 in February 1918. Post war, T190 served in the Weimar Republic's Reichsmarine, classed as a destroyer due to the Treaty of Versailles. She was rebuilt and modernised in 1923. She was renamed Claus von Bevern''' in 1938, serving as a research ship. The ship was still in service on the outbreak of the Second World War, taking part in the German Invasion of Denmark in 1940. At the end of the war, Claus von Bevern was captured by the United States. She was scuttled in 1946.

Construction and design
The Imperial German Navy ordered 12 large torpedo boats (Große Torpedoboote) as part of the fiscal year 1910 shipbuilding programme, with one half-flotilla of six ships (V186–V191) ordered from AG Vulcan and the other six ships from Germaniawerft.

The ship was armed with two 8.8 cm L/45 guns, one on the forecastle and one aft. Four single 50 cm (19.7 in) torpedo tubes were fitted, with two on the ship's beam in the gap between the forecastle and the ship's bridge which were capable of firing straight ahead, one between the ship's two funnels, and one aft of the funnels. The ship had a crew of 84 officers and men.V190 was laid down at AG Vulcan's Stettin shipyard as Yard number 308 and was launched on 12 April 1911 and completed on 5 August 1911.

Modifications
The ship was modified in 1923, and again in 1927–28. Two 10.5 cm L/45 guns replaced the 8.8 cm guns, while the torpedo armament remained four 50 cm tubes, but arranged in two twin mounts. When serving as a research ship, one of the 10.5 cm guns was removed, as was at least one set of torpedo tubes, with two 20mm anti-aircraft guns added.

Service

On 28 August 1914, the  British Harwich Force, supported by light cruisers and battlecruisers of the Grand Fleet, carried out  a raid towards Heligoland with the intention of destroying patrolling German torpedo boats. Four German light cruisers and another flotilla of torpedo boats (V Torpedo Boat Flotilla) was in the vicinity of Heligoland. V190 , a member of the 2nd Half Flotilla of I Torpedo Boat Flotilla, formed part of the outer screen of torpedo boats. At about 06:00 on 28 August, another member of the outer screen reported spotting the periscope of a submarine. As a result, the 5th Torpedo Boat Flotilla was ordered out to hunt the hostile submarine. At 07:57 G194 was fired on by British warships, and was soon retreating towards Heligoland, pursued by four British destroyers. V190 managed to successfully avoid the British ships and returned to base However, sister ship , leader of I Flotilla, ran into the midst of the Harwich force when trying to return to Heligoland and was sunk. The ship was still part of I Flotilla on 19 August 1916, when the High Seas Fleet sailed to cover a sortie of the battlecruisers of the 1st  Scouting Group, but was absent at the Battle of Jutland on 31 May–1 June 1916.

On 22 February 1918, V190 was renamed T190, in order to free her number for new construction, in this case the destroyer H190 which was ordered from Howaldswerke, but was cancelled at the end of the war. At the end of the war T190 was a member of the 15th Half-flotilla of the 8th Torpedo Boat Flotilla.

Between the wars
After the end of the First World War, the scuttling of the German High Seas Fleet at Scapa Flow on 21 June 1919 and the Treaty of Versailles left Germany with a small navy of obsolete warships, the Reichsmarine.  The Versailles treaty limited the German Navy's torpedo forces to 16 destroyers and 16 torpedo boats, with only twelve of each in active service, with replacement of the existing ships not allowed until 15 years after they were launched. Replacements could not exceed 800 t displacement for destroyers and 200 t for torpedo boats. T190 was one of the ships retained, and was classed as a destroyer for treaty purposes, although like the other ships retained as "destroyers", was always treated as a torpedo boat by the Reichsmarine.T190 was listed as being in reserve in 1922. She was refitted and modernised in 1922. In July 1926 T190 accompanied the battleship  on a visit to  Neufahrwasser; they were the first German warships to visit the Free City of Danzig since Germany lost control of the city to Poland after the war. She was refitted again in 1927–28, but by the 1930s these old torpedo boats were obsolete and were either scrapped or transferred to subsidiary roles. T190 became a research ship, and was renamed Claus von Bevern in 1938.

Second World WarClaus von Bevern remained in use during the Second World War, and during the German invasion of Denmark in April 1940, returned briefly to operational service, taking part in landing operations at Nyborg and Korsør alongside the battleship Schleswig-Holstein as part of Warship Group Seven. At the end of the war, Claus von Bevern'' was captured by Allied forces and allocated to the United States. She was scuttled in the Skagerrak in 1946.

Notes

References

Bibliography

 

 

Torpedo boats of the Imperial German Navy
World War I torpedo boats of Germany
Ships built in Stettin
1911 ships